Biarritz is a village and resort of the Costa de Oro in the Canelones Department of southern Uruguay.

Geography

Location

Population
In 2011 Biarritz had a population of 57.

References

External links
 Instituto Nacional de Estadística: Plan of Biarritz

Populated places in the Canelones Department
Seaside resorts in Uruguay